Zindagi Aur Toofan is a 1975 Bollywood film directed by Umesh Mathur. The music was composed by Laxmikant-Pyarelal.

Cast
Sajid Khan as Tony
Yogeeta Bali as Nalini
Rakesh Pandey as Govind
Rehana Sultan as Tara
Helen
Sulabha Deshpande
Anwar Hussain
Asit Sen

Songs

External links
 

1975 films
1970s Hindi-language films
Films scored by Laxmikant–Pyarelal